Thomas Ballantyne (August 13, 1829 – June 29, 1908) was a Canadian politician and Speaker of the Ontario Legislature.

Ballantyne was born in Peebles, Scotland, and immigrated to Canada in 1852. He made his fortune as a cheese manufacturer, becoming successful enough to be elected president of the Dairyman's Association. He contested the riding of Perth North in the 1871 provincial election as a Liberal but was defeated. After declining the federal Liberal nomination in the 1872 federal election, he stood in the 1875 provincial election for Perth South and was elected to the Legislative Assembly of Ontario as a Liberal by a margin of 180 votes.

Ballantyne was re-elected on four successive occasions. In 1891, he became Speaker of the legislature and was the first Speaker to preside in the new legislative buildings at Queen's Park. He retired from public life after his defeat in the 1894 provincial election.

References 
 
 

1829 births
1908 deaths
Speakers of the Legislative Assembly of Ontario
Ontario Liberal Party MPPs
People from Peebles